Politekhnicheskaya (translated: Polytechnical) is a station of the Saint Petersburg Metro. Opened on 31 December 1975.  It is named for the St. Petersburg Polytechnic Institute which is near the station.

External links

Saint Petersburg Metro stations
Railway stations in Russia opened in 1975
Railway stations located underground in Russia